Memories Within Miss Aggie is a 1974 American pornographic film directed by Gerard Damiano and starring Deborah Ashira, Eric Edwards, and Harry Reems. The film pays homage to both Damiano's previous skin flick The Devil in Miss Jones and Alfred Hitchcock's Psycho.

Plot
The narrative structure of the film involves a woman, the eponymous Miss Aggie (Ashira), recounting her previous sexual encounters to her lover (Edwards). The younger incarnations of Miss Aggie are played by other actresses. The veracity of Miss Aggie's memory is in doubt.

Cast
 Deborah Ashira as Aggie
 Eric Edwards as Richard I
 Harry Reems as Richard II 
 Kim Pope as Aggie I 
 Mary Stuart as Aggie II
 Darby Lloyd Rains as Aggie III

Oscar campaign
In 1975, Inish Kae, the film's distributor, launched an ad campaign touting the movie for Academy Award nominations. The ads in the entertainment industry trade press touted Miss Aggie for Oscars for Best Picture, Best Director (Damiano) and Best Actress (Deborah Ashira).

Home media
In September 2018, the film was restored in 2K and released on DVD and Blu-ray by Vinegar Syndrome.

See also
 List of American films of 1974

References

External links
 

1974 films
1970s pornographic films
American pornographic films
1970s English-language films
Films directed by Gerard Damiano
1970s American films